Long Point State Park (in the Finger Lakes) is a  state park located on the east shore of Cayuga Lake.  The park is in the Town of Ledyard in Cayuga County, New York.

Park description
The park offers a playground, picnic tables, hunting, fishing, hiking and a boat launch. A cottage is available for rent along the lake's shore. There is a $7 fee to park a car or launch a boat.

Long Point State Park trail system
In the Fall of 2013, community volunteers, with the approval of the New York State Office of Parks, Recreation and Historic Preservation, developed a new trail system on the east side of New York Route 90, which divides the formerly undeveloped inland section of the park from the waterfront section. The new trail system features secluded picnic tables and hilltop views of Cayuga Lake. A section of the trail system runs along the top of a small gorge.

See also
 List of New York state parks

References

External links
 New York State Parks: Long Point State Park - Finger Lakes

State parks of New York (state)
Parks in Cayuga County, New York
Finger Lakes